NWA USA is a professional wrestling streaming television program produced by the National Wrestling Alliance (NWA) that premiered on January 8, 2022 on YouTube. The show primarily revolves around the NWA Junior Heavyweight Championship division.

Episodes

Each season of NWA USA focuses on storylines leading into the NWA's pay-per-view events.

On-air personalities

In addition to the wrestlers (male and female), managers/valets, and referees, the show features various on-air personalities including authority figures, commentators, ring announcers, and backstage interviewers.

Authority figures

Commentators

Ring announcers

Backstage interviewers

See also

NWA Powerrr
List of professional wrestling television series

References

External links
 

 Official NWA YouTube channel

2022 American television series debuts
2020s American television series
National Wrestling Alliance shows
American professional wrestling television series
American non-fiction web series
English-language television shows
YouTube original programming